iNkatha may refer to:

 the iNkatha grass coil
 Inkatha Freedom Party, previously the Inkatha National Cultural Liberation Movement